Iguanodectidae is a family of freshwater fish in the order Characiformes that lives in South America. It is home to the subfamily Iguanodectinae (Eigenmann, 1909) and the monotypic Bryconops clade. Several species in the family, such as the green line lizard tetra (Iguanodectes spilurus), the tailspot tetra (Bryconops caudomaculatus), and the orangefin tetra (Bryconops affinis), are sometimes taken as aquarium fish.

Description 
Iguanodectids are generally small, and are brightly colored or reflective, making them moderately-popular ornamental fish. They range from 3.1 cm to 15 cm SL (standard length). They are rather narrow in shape, somewhat resembling minnows; ichthyologist Carl H. Eigenmann compared them to smelt.

Habitat 
Iguanodectids are found in South America, spread all across the northern half of the continent. Though they primarily inhabit freshwater, Iguanodectid fishes are known to tolerate brackish water as well. Habitat destruction, by way of land development and aquaculture, is the biggest threat to members of Iguanodectidae, though evaluated species are mostly considered least concern by the International Union for the Conservation of Nature (IUCN).

Classification 
Iguanodectidae is in the order Characiformes, with three extant genera - Bryconops, Iguanodectes, and Piabucus. Said genera used to be classified in the family Characidae, but have since been reclassified in order to keep Characidae monophyletic.

Species include:

Bryconops is the most speciose genus, with 21 valid species. Iguanodectes is next-largest with 8, and Piabucus has the fewest at 3.

Iguanodectes and Piabucus are largely considered to make up the subfamily Iguanodectinae, with Bryconops becoming its own separate clade, but this is a matter of debate. Several sources accept the subfamily Iguanodectinae as its own entity, but others consider it synonymous with Iguanodectidae or simply don't acknowledge it, uniting the genera therein. ITIS considers it synonymous with Characidae, which is a reflection of its older classification.

Iguanodectinae, when first officially classified by Carl H. Eigenmann in 1909, was placed in the family Characidae, and only contained the genus Iguanodectes; by 1929, it had grown to include the genus Piabucus. Through the year 1977, this remained the case. In 2011, Iguanodectinae was found to be closely related to Bryconops, and the two clades were combined in Iguanodectidae.

History 
The family Iguanodectidae was resurrected from Eigenmann's work in the year 2011 by Oliveira et al. to contain Iguanodectinae and Bryconops. Iguanodectinae itself was classified in 1909, and therefore Iguanodectidae is often considered to originate in the same year, despite the recent nature of the study.

Etymology 
The family name "Iguanodectidae" originates in the genus name "Iguanodectes", which used to be its sole representative. The origin of such was not made clear upon its nomination, but is assumed to be from "iguana", the lizard, and "dectes", meaning "bite", in reference to the general dentition's almost lizard-like formation. The common name "lizard bite tetra" has been proposed in reference to this, though this has not been widely accepted as of 2022.

In Aquaria 
Though data is limited, it is known that Bryconops colanegra, Bryconops colaroja, and Piabucus dentatus are seen in the ornamental fish trade. Iguanodectes geisleri is rare, but is sold under the name "red line lizard tetra". One of its congeners, Iguanodectes spilurus, is called the "green line lizard tetra", and is sensitive to poor water conditions.

References 

Characiformes
Ray-finned fish families